Simon the Sorcerer 4: Chaos Happens is an adventure game developed by Silver Style Entertainment. It was released by RTL Enterprises in February 2007 for Microsoft Windows.

Plot
After being knocked out by his little brother with a remote control, Simon has a vision of Alix (the buxom granddaughter of Calypso and his longtime crush) telling him the Magic Kingdom is in danger.

Simon instantly climbs into his dimension travelling wardrobe to go and investigate. On arrival he meets a distinctly undistressed Alix who not only has no idea what danger our hero is talking about but who also seems to think she's been dating Simon for months (or at least since the end of Simon the Sorcerer 3D) and wants to dump him for being too boring.

Development

Reception
Eurogamer acknowledged the game was an improvement over the previous version but remained over simplistic at times.
Metacritic lists an average score of 50 out of 100.

References

External links

Review with hardware requirements at Adventure Classic Gaming

2007 video games
Adventure games
Point-and-click adventure games
Simon the Sorcerer
Video games developed in Germany
Windows games
Windows-only games
Video game sequels
Single-player video games
Playlogic Entertainment games
Silver Style Entertainment games